Karnaugh is a surname. Notable people with the surname include:

 Maurice Karnaugh (1924–2022), American physicist, mathematician, and inventor
 Ron Karnaugh (born 1966), American retired swimmer

See also
 Karnaugh map